The 2018 Porsche Império GT3 Cup Challenge Brasil is the first one-make Porsche racing championship in South America for 911 GT3 Cup cars and this was the fourteenth season. It began on March 24 at Autódromo Internacional de Curitiba and finished on November 11 at Autódromo José Carlos Pace. It was first held in 2005 and follows the same formula basis used in the Porsche Supercup and  Porsche Carrera Cup championships held around the world.

Drivers
All cars are overseen by the Dener Motorsport team. From the 2018 season, the Porsche 911 GT3 Cup (Type 991), will now have the new Porsche 911 Cup (Type 991.2), making the category to align to the same molds played in other countries, now being called Porsche Imperio Carrera Cup 4.0 and Porsche Imperio Carrera Cup 3.8 (Equivalent to category Cup series) and Porsche Imperio GT3 Cup 4.0 and Porsche Imperio GT3 Cup 3.8 (Equivalent to category Challenge series).

Race Calendar and Results

Carrera Cup
All races are scheduled to be held in Brazil.

GT3 Cup
All races are scheduled to be held in Brazil.

Drivers' Championship

Points are awarded for each race at an event to the driver/s of a car that completed at least 70% of the race distance and was running at the completion of the race. The sprint races has the partially top 6 reserve grid. Only the best 10 results in each series counts for the championship.

Carrera Cup

GT3 Cup

External links
 
 Porsche GT3 Cup Brazil at Driver Database

Porsche GT3 Cup Brasil
Porsche GT3 Cup Brasil seasons